SOLEX is a free computer application that calculates and displays the positions and dynamics of bodies that are part of the Solar System. It was developed by Aldo Vitagliano, a professor of inorganic chemistry at the Federico II University of Naples.

SOLEX can generate ephemeris of Solar System objects, including planets and asteroids. It is capable of predicting their positions several millennia into the past and future, maintaining an accuracy equal to the JPL Horizons On-Line Ephemeris System and the US Navy's Astronomical Almanac. The software is bundled with the EXORB program that can determine the orbits of asteroids, comets and satellites, based on observation data as provided by the Minor Planet Center or NEODyS. The program can be used for asteroid impact prediction.

Programming

The program is written in BASIC for the PowerBASIC Console Compiler 3.0.

See also

Orbit determination
Planetarium software

References

2003 software
Free astronomy software
Free educational software
Free software programmed in BASIC
Science software for Windows